The 2018–19 Nebraska Cornhuskers women's basketball team represents the University of Nebraska during the 2018–19 NCAA Division I women's basketball season. The Cornhuskers, led by 3rd year head coach Amy Williams, play their home games at Pinnacle Bank Arena and are a member of the Big Ten Conference. They finished the season 14–16, 11–5 in Big Ten play to finish in a 4 way for sixth place. They lost in the first round of the Big Ten women's tournament to Purdue.

Roster

Schedule

|-
!colspan=9 style=|Exhibition

|-
!colspan=9 style=| Non-conference regular season

|-
!colspan=9 style=| Big Ten conference season

|-
!colspan=9 style=| Big Ten Women's Tournament

Rankings

See also
 2018–19 Nebraska Cornhuskers men's basketball team

References

Nebraska Cornhuskers women's basketball seasons
Nebraska
Cornhusk
Cornhusk